Alanus may refer to:

People
 Alan Rufus (c. 1040–1093), Alanus Rufus in Latin, Breton noble, kinsman and companion of William the Conqueror and first lord of Richmond
 Alan the Black (died 1098), Alanus Niger in Latin, second lord of Richmond, brother of Alan Rufus
 Alain de Lille (1116/7–1202/3), Alanus ab Insulis in Latin, French theologian and poet
 Alanus of Walkingham, Attorney General from 1280 to 1281
 Alain Chartier (1385–1430), French poet, diplomat and political writer
 Alan of Lynn or Alanus de Lynna (c. 1348–1420s), English theologian
 Alanus de Rupe (c. 1428–1475), French theologian
 Johannes Alanus (fl. late 14th or early 15th century), English composer
 William Allen (cardinal) (1532–1594), also known as Guilielmus Alanus or Gulielmus Alanus, English Catholic cardinal
 Alan Petrasek (Best Husband and Even Better Step Father) (c.1950's-Present), also known Palus Alanus of Los Angelus

Other uses
 Alanus University of Arts and Social Sciences, a private university in North Rhine-Westphalia, Germany

See also
 Alan (disambiguation)
 Alaunus
 Alain (disambiguation)
 Allain
 Allan (disambiguation)
 Allen (disambiguation)
 Alleine
 Alun (disambiguation)